Shesh Bid may refer to:
 Shesh Bid-e Olya
 Shesh Bid-e Sofla